The Federal Center for Technological Education "Celso Suckow da Fonseca", also known as Federal Center for Technological Education of Rio de Janeiro ( or , CEFET/RJ), is one of the most traditional Brazilian federal educational institution subordinated to the Brazilian Ministry of Education. It offers undergraduate and post-graduate level courses in addition to its sought-after technical high school courses.

The school's education is focused in the engineering fields of mechanics, information technology, electronics, telecommunication, metallurgy, petrochemical and electrical.

Its multicampus headquarters is in Maracanã with an additional campus in the Rio de Janeiro suburb of Maria da Graça,  and several other campuses in different cities of the state of Rio de Janeiro.

The history of CEFET/RJ 

In Brazil, the Federal Centers of Technical Education (CEFETs) reflect an evolution of a kind of educational institution that in the 20th century helped to industrialize the country. The history of these centers is connected to the origin of professional education in Brazil going back to 1909 when President Nilo Peçanha mandated the creation of the apprenticeship Schools in every Brazilian state capital vis-à-vis providing free elementary and professional education.

The institution we know as CEFET/RJ started in 1917 as the Escola Normal de Artes e Ofícios Wenceslau Brás. In 1919 the school moved under the jurisdiction of the Federal Government. After the reformulation of the Ministry of Education in 1937 it became part of the network of professionalizing schools maintained by the Federal Government.

The school was also known as: 
Escola Tecnica Nacional, Escola Tecnica Federal da Guanabara (1965)
Escola Tecnica Federal Celso Suckow da Fonseca (in 1967, as a posthumous homage to its first director) 
Centro Federal de Educação Tecnológica Celso Suckow da Fonseca (1978)

Academics

Technical Courses

 Electrical
 Electronics
 Control and Automation
 Telecommunications
 Mechanics
 Metrology
 Automotive Maintenance
 Buildings
 Ports
 Roads
 Computing
 Administration
 Workplace safety
 Tourism
 Environment
 Nursing
 Chemistry
 Foods
 Meteorology

Undergraduate Courses
, it is offered 20 undergraduate courses.

 Computer Science
 Information Systems
 Computer Engineering
 Internet Services Technology
 Physics
 Civil Engineering
 Electrical Engineering
 Electronic Engineering
 Environmental Engineering
 Metallurgical Engineering
 Control Engineering
 Telecommunications Engineering
 Mechanical Engineering
 Production Engineering
 Food Engineering
 Administration
 Workplace safety
 Tourism Management
 Environmental Management
 Applied Foreign Languages for International Negotiations

Post-Graduation Courses

There are 15 post-graduation courses, being 7 lato sensu (specialization) and 8 stricto sensu (master's and doctor's degrees).

Campi

The CEFET/RJ have 8 campi in 7 different cities in the Rio de Janeiro State.

 Maracanã, the main campus, bases in the neighborhood of Maracanã, in Rio de Janeiro City
 Maria da Graça, the second campus in the Rio de Janeiro City, in the Maria da Graça neighborhood.
 Angra dos Reis, in the city with the same name.
 Itaguaí, in the city with the same name.
 Nova Friburgo, in the city with the same name.
 Nova Iguaçu, in the city with the same name.
 Petrópolis, in the city with the same name.
 Valença, in the city with the same name.

See also
CEFET

References

External links
Official Page CEFET-RJ (in Portuguese)
CEFET/RJ - Seu Tempo e sua História (Extensive YouTube Video about the CEFET RJ History in Portuguese)
CEFET-RJ campus at 229 Maracanã Ave. to the right of the Estádio do Maracanã (Maracanã Stadium) :   Google maps aerial view.

Educational institutions established in 1917
Universities and colleges in Rio de Janeiro (city)
Technical universities and colleges in Brazil
1917 establishments in Brazil
Rio de Janeiro